Corton is an Appellation d'origine contrôlée (AOC) and Grand Cru vineyard for red and white wine in Côte de Beaune subregion of Burgundy. It is located on a hill shared between the three villages of Aloxe-Corton, Pernand-Vergelesses and Ladoix in the Côte de Beaune, Burgundy. The appellation covers the lower parts of the Corton hill and includes several subordinate vineyard names, or climats, within the AOC. Because of the size of the AOC and the variability of these climats, it is the rule rather than the exception that the name of the climat is indicated together with that of the Corton AOC, leading to designations such as Corton Clos du Roi and Corton Les Bressandes. Corton is rare in this aspect, as the 'climat' is seldom used for other Grand Cru appellations in Côte d'Or. The AOC was created in 1937.

Corton wines are mostly red (around 95 per cent of the total production in the AOC) and made from the Pinot noir grape, however a smaller quantity of white Corton from Chardonnay is also produced. Around 500,000 bottles a year are produced from the vines.

The Corton appellation itself is the Côte de Beaune's only Grand Cru appellation for red wine, and is the largest Grand Cru of Burgundy.

Production

In 2008,  of vineyard surface was in production within the AOC, and 2,984 hectoliter of wine was produced, of which 2,822 hectoliter red and 162 hectoliter white. This corresponds to just under 400,000 bottles, of which just over 21,000 were white Corton.

Producers

As with most Burgundy vineyards, several different producers own parts of the vineyard and produce and sell their own finished wines, or sell their grapes or wines to négociant-éleveurs for vinification or bottling and distribution.

Corton, Corton-Charlemagne and Charlemagne
There are three partially overlapping Grand Cru AOCs that cover the vineyards on the Corton hill; Corton for red and white wine, Corton-Charlemagne for white wine, and the little used Charlemagne for white wine. Corton-Charlemagne from Chardonnay grapes mostly originate from the higher parts of the hill. The vineyard surface of these three appellations totalled  in 2008. Many vineyard parcels on the hill are allowed to be used either for red Corton or white Corton-Charlemagne.

Climats
The following climats exist within the Corton AOC:

In Aloxe-Corton:

In Ladoix-Serrigny:

In Pernand-Vergelesses:

See also
French wine
List of Burgundy Grand Crus

References

Burgundy (historical region) AOCs